Commitment Hasan is a 2021 Turkish drama film directed by Semih Kaplanoğlu. In June 2021, the film was selected to compete in the Un Certain Regard section at the 2021 Cannes Film Festival. It was selected as the Turkish entry for the Best International Feature Film at the 94th Academy Awards.

Plot
A farmer reflects on his past as he prepares to make his pilgrimage to Mecca.

Cast
 Umut Karadag as Hasan
 Filiz Bozok as Emine
 Gökhan Azlag as Serdar
 Ayse Gunyuz Demirci as Nisa
 Mahir Günsiray as Muzaffer
 Hakan Altiner as Hakim Mehmet

Release
The film had its release on 11 July 2021 at the 2021 Cannes Film Festival, where it also competed in the Un Certain Regard section. It is also selected to compete in ICFT UNESCO Gandhi Medal at the 52nd International Film Festival of India, where it will be screened in November 2021.

See also
 List of submissions to the 94th Academy Awards for Best International Feature Film
 List of Turkish submissions for the Academy Award for Best International Feature Film

References

External links
 

2021 films
2021 drama films
Turkish drama films
2020s Turkish-language films
Films directed by Semih Kaplanoğlu